McConnell is an unincorporated community and census-designated place (CDP) in Logan County, West Virginia, United States, on the Guyandotte River. As of the 2010 census, its population was 514. It was established in 1933.

The community was named after one Mr. McConnell, a railroad promoter.

Geography
McConnell is in central Logan County, on the east side of the Guyandotte River, a north-flowing tributary of the Ohio River. The CDP is bordered to the north by Stollings. Hanging Rock Highway, former West Virginia Route 10, is the main road through the community, leading northwest (downriver)  to Logan, the county seat, and southeast (upriver)  to Man.

References

Census-designated places in Logan County, West Virginia
Census-designated places in West Virginia
Populated places on the Guyandotte River